Stygia mosulensis is a species of moth of the family Cossidae. It is found in Bulgaria and Greece, as well as in Iraq and Iran.

References

Moths described in 1965
Stygiinae
Moths of Europe